Shelby Ann Fero (born October 27, 1993) is an American writer and comedian.

Early life
Fero was born at Stanford Hospital on October 27, 1993. After graduating from Menlo-Atherton High School, she attended the USC School of Cinematic Arts before leaving to pursue a career in comedy.

Career
Shelby Fero is an American comedian best known for her popular tweets. She has written for Cracked and HelloGiggles. Fero has done stand-up at Magic Bag (Eliza Skinner's and DC Pierson's stand-up showcase in Los Angeles). She appeared on a live version of WTF with Marc Maron, and has been a panelist several times on National Public Radio's Wait Wait... Don't Tell Me show. She played Denise (mispronounced as Dee-nice) in Key & Peele's viral "Substitute Teacher" sketch. In 2016, she won an Emmy Award for Outstanding Short Form Animated Program.

Filmography

Film
  2013 Froyo Robbery (Short) 
  2014 DeAndre Jordan's Amazing Charles Barkley Impression (Short)
  2014 The Live Read of Space Jam with Blake Griffin (Short)

Television
 Other Space
 Money from Strangers
 @midnight
 Chozen
Robot Chicken
Brad Neely's Harg Nallin Sclopio Peepio
Disney's 3x5 Live
 Idiotest Season 3, episode 18 (2016)
 ''Loiter Squad Season 3

See also
 List of Wait Wait... Don't Tell Me! episodes (2016)
 List of Wait Wait... Don't Tell Me! episodes (2014)
 Hey Girl (TV series)
 List of WTF with Marc Maron episodes

References

External links

1993 births
American women comedians
American women screenwriters
People from Santa Clara, California
Living people
USC School of Cinematic Arts alumni
Comedians from California
Primetime Emmy Award winners
Screenwriters from California
21st-century American comedians
21st-century American screenwriters
21st-century American women writers